Sedyash (Siźäş) is a rural locality (a village) and the administrative centre of Verkhnesuyansky Selsoviet, Karaidelsky District, Bashkortostan, Russia. The population was 301 as of 2010. There are 5 streets.

Geography 
Sedyash is located 75 km northeast of Karaidel (the district's administrative centre) by road. Ust-Bartaga is the nearest rural locality.

References 

Rural localities in Karaidelsky District